Angelique Elisabeth Seriese (born 12 July 1968 in Zevenbergen, North Brabant) is a former Dutch judoka, who became world champion in the 78 kg category at the 1995 World Judo Championships.

Seriese won a gold medal in the +72 kg division at the 1988 Summer Olympics when women's judo was introduced as a demonstration sport. Other medals include eight European championship victories, bronze at the 1987 World Championships in Essen and silver at the 1993 World Championships in Hamilton.

External links
 

1968 births
Living people
Dutch female judoka
Judoka at the 1988 Summer Olympics
Judoka at the 1996 Summer Olympics
Olympic gold medalists for the Netherlands
Olympic judoka of the Netherlands
People from Moerdijk
Medalists at the 1988 Summer Olympics
Sportspeople from North Brabant
20th-century Dutch women
20th-century Dutch people